Mother Focus is the fifth studio album by the band Focus, released in 1975 on Polydor (cat. no. 2310 408) in Europe, on Atco Records in North America and on EMI in Japan. 

Some tracks on the album mark a departure from the progressive rock style that dominated the group's prior work, and herald a funk music style with light jazz and pop at the centre. Unlike previous albums, the tracks were also much shorter, the longest being 3:55. Bassist Bert Ruiter provided most of the themes, as van Leer had just recorded a solo album, O My Love, of his own music, and Jan Akkerman withheld compositions for Eli, his forthcoming album with Kaz Lux.

The closing track, "Father Bach", is credited as a 'traditional tune', arranged and adopted by Thijs van Leer, but in reality it consists of the opening lines of J. S. Bach’s St. Matthew Passion.

Track listing 
Track listing of Dutch vinyl release 1975.

CD listing 
Track listing of Japanese release from 16 December 2006.
 "Mother Focus" (Jan Akkerman, Bert Ruiter, Thijs van Leer) – 3:04
 "I Need a Bathroom" (Ruiter) – 3:03
 "Bennie Helder" (van Leer) – 3:31
 "Soft Vanilla" (Ruiter) – 3:03
 "Hard Vanilla" (Ruiter) – 2:34
 "Tropical Bird" (Ruiter) – 2:42
 "Focus IV" (van Leer) – 3:56
 "Someone's Crying . . . What?" (Akkerman) – 3:18
 "All Together . . . Oh, That!" (Akkerman) – 3:41
 "No Hang Ups" (Paul Stoppelman) – 2:55
 "My Sweetheart" (Akkerman, van Leer) – 3:36
 "Father Bach" (van Leer) – 1:34

Personnel 
Focus
 Thijs van Leer – Hammond organ, electric piano, grand piano, Solina String Ensemble, concert and alto flutes, voices, synthesizers, piano, saxophone on track 8, flute, non-lexical vocables (track 1)
 Jan Akkerman – guitar
 Bert Ruiter – bass guitar, vocals (track 2)
 David Kemper – drums
 Colin Allen – drums (track 2)

Charts

References 

1975 albums
Focus (band) albums
Atco Records albums